Caenopedina is a genus of sea urchins of the family Pedinidae.

Species 
Species accepted within Caenopedina:

 Caenopedina alanbakeri Rowe, 1989
 Caenopedina annulata Mortensen, 1940
 Caenopedina capensis H.L. Clark, 1923
 Caenopedina cubensis A. Agassiz, 1869
 Caenopedina diomedeae Mortensen, 1939
 Caenopedina hawaiiensis H.L. Clark, 1912
 Caenopedina indica  (de Meijere, 1903) 
 Caenopedina mirabilis  (Döderlein, 1885) 
 Caenopedina novaezealandiae Pawson, 1964
 Caenopedina otagoensis McKnight, 1968
 Caenopedina porphyrogigas Anderson, 2009
 Caenopedina pulchella  (A. Agassiz & H.L. Clark, 1907) 
 Caenopedina superba H.L. Clark, 1925

References 

Animals described in 1869
Pedinoida
Echinoidea genera